Here are Lovers is a novel by Welsh author Hilda Vaughan.

Synopsis
Laetitia Wingfield, daughter of the Anglicised Squire Wingfield, is rescued by Gronwy Griffith, the son a Welsh tenant farmer.

Publication
Here are Lovers was Vaughan's second novel, published in the summer of 1926.

References

Here Are Lovers, reprinted by Honno Welsh Women's Classics

Sources
 Thomas, Lucy (2008). "The Fiction of Hilda Vaughan (1892–1985): Negotiating the Boundaries of Welsh Identity". PhD Thesis. University of Cardiff. 12 Mar. 2014.

Novels by Hilda Vaughan